Saif Durbar is an Indian-Pakistani businessman. He is a former principal adviser of the presidents of the Central African Republic Ange Felix Patasse and François Bozizé, and a former Deputy Minister of Foreign Affairs in the Central African Republic.

Life and career 
Saif Durbar was born in 1962 in Gujarat, India, close to the Pakistan border. His family remained close to the British after decolonisation, and was also connected to Gulf monarchies. Durbar is the grandson of one of the last nawab. His father owns factories of plastics, textiles and steel. After studying in England and then in Pakistan, Durbar joined the family business prior to starting his own business in 1987. It involved import, export, bond trading and banking.  In 1995 after the loss of nearly a billion dollars he branched out into mining and investments in Africa and started property development with large capitalization.

In 1993, he started working in Africa, developing businesses in infrastructure and real estate in Zaire until the fall of Mobutu in 1997. He continued in Central African Republic, creating businesses in mining and bringing international investors to the region. It made him an economic adviser to president Ange Felix Patasse whom he represented at the United Nations.

In 2006, the became an advisor to president François Bozizé, and later in 2009 his deputy foreign minister.

Saif Durbar is the founder and CEO of Girc, Bridge Africa Counselage, and founder of philanthropic organisation Kutamani, which provides educational tools for students in Africa.

He started a property fund and was involved in a few large property deals in Britain and Europe, including Southern France. He also took part in setting up the Saudi Construction Group. Together with Paul Bloomfield and Sheikh Faisal al-Sharif, chairman of DGI, they announced in 2009 the partnership with Bovis Lend Lease and Foster & Partners on a $13 billion (£7.4 billion) plan to develop a new city of 750,000 new homes in Saudi Arabia.

Controversies 
Durbar was the adviser of Bozize, when the Canadian company Uramin acquired 90% of the Bakouma uranium mine.

In 2007, the French state-owned nuclear company Areva purchased Uramin and its mines for 1.8 billion euros. According to Durbar, the acquisition took place without notification of change of ownership to the CAR government who owned 15% of Uramin, Durbar got the government to appoint lawyers and request justification for the transaction. The mines were later proved unusable for their low uranium concentration and expensive logistics, which Areva's CEO Anne Lauvergeon was aware of. This brought out allegations of a possible corruption operation.

In 2014, Vincent Crouzet published a book 'Radioactive' about the Uramin scandal with Saif Durbar as one of the main protagonists and a key witness.

In August 2007, the French government issued a warrant against Durbar following his conviction on appeal for fraud on a 1995 case, a month after the CAR government issued a notice to Areva for justification.

In October 2008 the US ambassador to Bangui reported France's desire "to limit the influence of Saiffee Durbar, including by using the legal proceedings against him". To protect Durbar, Bozize appointed him Deputy Minister of Foreign Affairs, offering him diplomatic immunity. Following pressure from France he left the position. At the end of 2009, after his resignation as Deputy Minister of Foreign Affairs, he went to France to defend himself and to negotiate his extradition. After a three-month stay in the VIP the Sante district in Paris, he was placed on probation for six months under house arrest in a Paris apartment. When the probation period was over, in September 2010 he left France.

See also
Jan Bonde Nielsen

References

Living people
Year of birth missing (living people)
Central African Republic businesspeople
Indian fraudsters
Central African Republic politicians